The Victorian Kitchen Garden is a 13-part British television series produced in 1987 by Keith Sheather for BBC2, based on an idea by Jennifer Davies, who later became associate producer. It recreated a kitchen garden of the Victorian era at Leverton, Berkshire (near Chilton Foliat, Wiltshire). The presenter was the horticultural lecturer, Peter Thoday, the master gardener was Harry Dodson, and the director was Keith Sheather.

The theme music and soundtrack was composed by Paul Reade and performed principally by Emma Johnson playing the clarinet. It won the 1991 Ivor Novello award for best TV theme music.

Content
The series began in the largely derelict walled garden at Chilton Lodge, and followed Dodson and his assistant, Alison, as they recreated the working kitchen garden.

The work involved many repairs, from replanting the box (Buxus) edging and replacing the gravel walks, to reglazing the cold frames and repairing the Victorian wood-framed, brick-based glass-houses. The team were determined to use plants that the Victorian head gardener would have had available. The programme displayed the various tools and techniques of Victorian gardening. Dodson had used many of both and therefore could demonstrate how they were used.

Episodes

Sequels and later availability
The series was successful and spawned three sequels:

 The Victorian Kitchen (with Ruth Mott), 1989
 The Victorian Flower Garden, 1991
 The Wartime Kitchen and Garden, 1993
 Harry's Big Adventure, 1994

Each of the series (except for The Wartime Kitchen and Garden) is commercially available on DVD, distributed by Acorn Media UK. Accompanying books of all four series were written by the associate producer, Jennifer Davies, and published by BBC Books.
The Victorian Kitchen. London: B.B.C. Books, 1989  
The Victorian Kitchen Garden Companion; Harry Dodson and Jennifer Davies. London: B.B.C. Books, 1988 
The Victorian Kitchen Garden. London: B.B.C. Books, 1987

Reception
Writing for The Guardian in 2009 during a repeat of the series, Lucy Mangan found that it was the "details that make the programme sing" and concluded by saying: "May it flourish somewhere in the schedules for ever."

Writer Helen Rosner discovered several episodes of the show online during the spring of 2020, and wrote a long article praising it for The New Yorker: "The Soothing Pleasures of "The Victorian Kitchen Garden", a Vintage BBC Docuseries".

References

External links
 
 Presenter Peter Thoday, now age 81, recalls memories of Harry Dodson, Ruth Mott and making the series (video)
 Revisiting The Victorian Kitchen Garden location (video)

BBC television documentaries
Gardening in the United Kingdom
Historical reality television series
1987 British television series debuts
1987 British television series endings
English-language television shows
Gardening television